Kim Sang-pil (born 26 April 1989) is a South Korean footballer who plays as centre-back for Asan Mugunghwa in K League 2.

Career
Kim joined K League Classic side FC Seoul in 2013, but made no appearance in his first club.

He moved to Daejeon Citizen in January 2014.

He signed with Chungju Hummel before the 2016 season starts.

References

External links 

1989 births
Living people
Association football central defenders
South Korean footballers
FC Seoul players
Daejeon Hana Citizen FC players
Chungju Hummel FC players
Asan Mugunghwa FC players
K League 1 players
K League 2 players